Samar Ben Koelleb (born 15 November 1995) is a Tunisian athlete who competes in both shot put and discus for her country. She won the silver medal in the women's F41 shot put at the 2016 Summer Paralympics, and bronze medals in both sports at the 2017 World Para Athletics Championships.

Career
Born on 15 November 1995 in Tunisia, Samar Ben Koelleb went on to compete for her nation in both discuss and shot put. Ben Koelleb competed at the 2016 Summer Paralympics in Rio de Janeiro, Brazil. She also competed in the F41 discus throw competition, but fell outside of the podium positions which were taken up by Irish athlete Niamh McCarthy in silver, and fellow Tunisians Fathia Amaimia in bronze, and Tlili who once again won the gold medal.

At the World Para Athletics Grand Prix, held in 2017 in Tunis, Ben Koelleb once again won the silver medal in the F41 discus competition on day one. Later that year, she competed at the World Para Athletics Championships in London, at the site of the 2012 Paralympic Games. On this occasion, Ben Koelleb won two medals, a bronze in each of the F41 shot put and discus.

References

External links 
 

Living people
1995 births
Tunisian female shot putters
Tunisian female discus throwers
Paralympic silver medalists for Tunisia
Paralympic athletes of Tunisia
Athletes (track and field) at the 2016 Summer Paralympics
Athletes (track and field) at the 2020 Summer Paralympics
Medalists at the 2016 Summer Paralympics
Paralympic medalists in athletics (track and field)
21st-century Tunisian women